Englerodendron leptorrhachis is a species of tree in the family Fabaceae. It is endemic to Cameroon. Its natural habitat is subtropical or tropical dry forests. It is threatened by habitat loss.

References

leptorrhachis
Flora of Cameroon
Trees of Africa
Critically endangered plants